Jefferson Parish is a parish in the U.S. state of Louisiana. As of the 2020 census, the population was 440,781. Its parish seat is Gretna, its largest community is Metairie, and its largest incorporated city is Kenner. Jefferson Parish is included in the Greater New Orleans area.

History

1825 to 1940

Jefferson Parish was named in honor of U.S. President Thomas Jefferson of Virginia when the parish was established by the Louisiana Legislature on February 11, 1825, a year before Jefferson died. A bronze statue of Jefferson stands at the entrance of the General Government Complex on Derbigny Street in Gretna. The parish seat was in the city of Lafayette, until that area was annexed by New Orleans in 1852. In that year the parish government moved to Carrollton, where it remained for twenty-two years.

Originally, this parish was larger than it is today, running from Felicity Street in New Orleans to the St. Charles Parish line. However, as New Orleans grew, it absorbed the cities of Lafayette, Jefferson City, Carrollton, and several unincorporated areas (faubourgs). These became part of Orleans Parish. The present borders between Jefferson Parish and Orleans Parish were set in 1874. The Jefferson Parish seat was moved to Gretna at the same time. (The historic city of Lafayette in Jefferson Parish, as it was recorded in U.S. census records until 1870, should not be confused with Lafayette, Louisiana, in Lafayette Parish.)

1940 to 2000
From the 1940s to the 1970s, Jefferson's population swelled with an influx of middle-class white families from Orleans Parish. The parish's population doubled in size from 1940 to 1950 and again from 1950 to 1960 as the parents behind the post–World War II baby boom, profiting from rising living standards and dissatisfied with their old neighborhoods, chose relocation to new neighborhoods of detached single-family housing.  By the 1960s, rising racial tensions in New Orleans complicated the impetus behind the migration, as many new arrivals sought not only more living space but also residence in a political jurisdiction independent from New Orleans proper.

The earliest postwar subdivisions were developed on the Eastbank of Jefferson Parish ("East Jefferson") along the pre-existing Jefferson Highway and Airline Highway routes, often relatively far-removed from the New Orleans city line, as land prices were lower further away from New Orleans and land assembly was easier. The completion of Veterans Highway in the late 1950s, following a route parallel to Airline but further north, stimulated more development.  The arrival of I-10 in the early 1960s resulted in the demolition of some homes in the Old Metairie neighborhood, where development began in the 1920s, but resulted in even easier access to suburban East Jefferson.

In the portion of Jefferson Parish on the Westbank of the Mississippi River ("West Jefferson"), large-scale suburban development commenced with the completion, in 1958, of the Greater New Orleans Bridge crossing the Mississippi River at downtown New Orleans. Terrytown, within the city limits of Gretna, was the first large subdivision to be developed.  Subsequent development has been extensive, taking place within Harvey, Marrero, Westwego and Avondale.

Similar to the development trajectory observed by other U.S. suburban areas, Jefferson began to enjoy a significant employment base by the 1970s and 1980s, shedding its earlier role as a simple bedroom community. In East Jefferson, the Causeway Boulevard corridor grew into a commercial office node, while the Elmwood neighborhood developed as a center for light manufacturing and distribution.  By the mid-1990s, Jefferson Parish was exhibiting some of the symptoms presented by inner-ring suburbs throughout the United States. Median household income growth slowed, even trailing income growth rates in New Orleans proper, such that the inner city began to narrow the gap in median household income, a gap at its widest at the time of the 1980 census. St. Tammany Parish and, to a lesser extent, St. Charles Parish began to attract migrants from New Orleans, and increasingly even from Jefferson Parish itself. These trends were catalyzed by Hurricane Katrina, which destroyed much of New Orleans' low-income housing and propelled further numbers of lower-income individuals into Jefferson Parish.

Despite these challenges, Jefferson Parish still contains the largest number of middle class residents in metropolitan New Orleans and acts as the retail hub for the entire metro area.

Hurricane Katrina (2005)

Even though Jefferson Parish was affected by Hurricane Katrina, it has rebounded more quickly than Orleans Parish, since the devastation was not as severe. The parish has a current population of 432,000, which is 15,000 fewer people than was recorded by the 2000 U.S. census. New Orleans' Katrina-provoked population loss has resulted in Jefferson Parish becoming the second most populous parish behind East Baton Rouge Parish, center of the Baton Rouge metropolitan area.

With the landfall of Hurricane Katrina on August 29, 2005, Jefferson Parish took a hard hit. On the East Bank, widespread flooding occurred, especially in the eastern part of the parish, as well as much wind damage. Schools also were reported to have been severely damaged. On the West Bank, there was little to no flooding, though there was still much wind damage. As a result, the Jefferson Parish Council temporarily moved the parish government to Baton Rouge. Evacuees of Jefferson Parish were told that they could expect to be able to go back to their homes starting Monday, September 5, 2005, between the hours of 6 a.m. CDT and 6 p.m. CDT, but would have to return to their places of evacuation because life in the area was not sustainable. There were no open grocery stores or gas stations, and almost the entire parish had no electric, water, or sewerage services. Moreover, evacuations out of New Orleans were continuing to be staged from the heart of Metairie at the intersection of Interstate 10 and Causeway Boulevard, and traffic throughout the area was primarily restricted to emergency and utility vehicles.

On September 4, Jefferson Parish President Aaron Broussard broke down on Meet the Press

RUSSERT: You just heard the director of Homeland Security’s explanation of what has happened this last week. What is your reaction?

BROUSSARD: We have been abandoned by our own country. Hurricane Katrina will go down in history as one of the worst storms ever to hit an American coast. But the aftermath of Hurricane Katrina will go down as one of the worst abandonments of Americans on American soil ever in U.S. history. … Whoever is at the top of this totem pole, that totem pole needs to be chainsawed off and we’ve got to start with some new leadership. It’s not just Katrina that caused all these deaths in New Orleans here. Bureaucracy has committed murder here in the greater New Orleans area and bureaucracy has to stand trial before Congress now....

Three quick examples. We had Wal-Mart deliver three trucks of water. FEMA turned them back. They said we didn’t need them. This was a week ago. FEMA, we had 1,000 gallons of diesel fuel on a Coast Guard vessel docked in my parish. When we got there with our trucks, FEMA says don’t give you the fuel. Yesterday — yesterday — FEMA comes in and cuts all of our emergency communication lines. They cut them without notice. Our sheriff, Harry Lee, goes back in, he reconnects the line. He posts armed guards and said no one is getting near these lines…

I want to give you one last story and I’ll shut up and let you tell me whatever you want to tell me. The guy who runs this building I’m in, Emergency Management, he’s responsible for everything. His mother was trapped in St. Bernard nursing home and every day she called him and said, "Are you coming, son? Is somebody coming?" and he said, "Yeah, Mama, somebody's coming to get you." Somebody's coming to get you on Tuesday. Somebody's coming to get you on Wednesday. Somebody's coming to get you on Thursday. Somebody's coming to get you on Friday… and she drowned Friday night. She drowned Friday night! [Sobbing] Nobody's coming to get us. Nobody's coming to get us…

By the following weekend, the local electrical utility, Entergy, had restored power to large swaths of Jefferson Parish, and the parish public works department had restored water and sewer service to most of the areas with power.  East Jefferson General Hospital never ceased operation, even through the storm.  Nevertheless, Mr. Broussard continued to discourage residents from returning until all major streets were clear of downed trees, powerlines and major debris. The parish's initial focus was on helping businesses through the "Jumpstart Jefferson" program that allowed business operators into the parish before residents.  Nevertheless, some independent-minded residents began moving back into the parish even before Broussard issued a formal "all-clear", and some gas stations, grocery stores, restaurants and a Home Depot were in operation during this time.

Broussard's report of the events he discussed on Meet the Press have subsequently proven to be inaccurate. The son of the drowned woman was later identified as Thomas Rodrigue, who replied, "No, no, that's not true," when told of Broussard's account. An MSNBC interview with the man revealed that Rodrigue tried to contact his mother at the St. Rita nursing home on the days before the storm – Saturday, August 27 and Sunday, August 28, not Monday through Friday as Broussard had claimed—to encourage the home to evacuate. They did not, resulting in the deaths by drowning of more than 30 other residents.

Crucially, Jefferson's levees and floodwalls did not fail in the wake of Katrina, enabling floodwaters to be rapidly pumped out. As of October 2006, Jefferson Parish had, in effect, completely rebounded from Hurricane Katrina, while far more damaged Orleans Parish continued recovering at a slower rate.  Estimates of Jefferson Parish's population ranged from 420,000 to 440,000, and this figure was expected to continue to rise as evacuated residents from Orleans Parish returned to metropolitan New Orleans.

Katrina-related flooding
Flooding on the east bank has been frequently attributed to the decision by parish leadership to deactivate the stormwater pumping systems and evacuate the operators during the storm.  Katrina's substantial storm surge may have swamped even operating pumping stations but Broussard's activation of the parish's "Doomsday Plan" is the most frequently cited reason for the flooding in all areas of the east bank except Old Metairie and parts of Harahan. Pump operators were evacuated to areas outside the parish that were themselves severely affected by the storm and pump station personnel were consequently unable to immediately return to restart the pumps. They did not arrive until the morning of August 31. Water resulting from the backflow through the non-operating pumping stations, as well as storm-related rainwater, remained on the streets and in the homes of residents of Metairie and Kenner for a day and a half.  Many homes which were not severely damaged by storm winds took heavy flood damage, especially along both sides of the West Esplanade canal, from the 17th Street Canal to Kenner.  The parish has subsequently announced that it will change the way it evacuates critical personnel during an emergency, both through the construction of "safe-houses" and use of existing facilities on the west bank of Jefferson Parish. The original "safe-house" project was severely modified due to rising costs and was further delayed due to a conflict of interest revealed by the original contractors. There are also plans to add manual closures on the pumping stations due to the failure of the compressed air systems during Katrina's storm surge.

Much additional consideration has been given to the different problem of the flooding in Old Metairie that resulted from Jefferson Parish's reliance on the failed Orleans Parish drainage system at the 17th Street Canal and its Pumping Station No. 6. Flooding in this area south of Metairie Road between the Orleans Parish line and Causeway Boulevard was catastrophic and deep water destroyed much of the most expensive real estate in the parish.  A temporary plan was devised to pool water at the Pontiff Playground and south of Airline Drive and to divert some into other Jefferson Parish drainage canals. A longer-term project to divert water from this vulnerable area into the Mississippi River has also been suggested, although its expense appears to be prohibitive. Jefferson Parish officials have also struggled to maximize the parish's ability to utilize the significantly reduced pumping capacity of the 17th Street Canal if the threat of storm surge again requires the Corps of Engineers to close the mouth of the canal.

Gretna controversy

The city of Gretna, Louisiana, the parish seat of Jefferson Parish, made news after its police force participated, along with Crescent City Connection Police and Jefferson Parish Sheriff's deputies, in a road block on the Crescent City Connection Bridge in the days following Hurricane Katrina. The purpose was to stop evacuees from crossing over into the evacuated communities on the Westbank of the Mississippi River.  Gretna Police had charge of Westbank-bound lanes, while Jefferson Parish deputies controlled the east bank-bound lanes and the bridge police closed the transit lanes.

Initially, as many as 6,000 evacuees were permitted to cross and were shuttled out of the area on buses; however, that operation was eventually discontinued as available fuel supplies were exhausted. Without transportation or sufficient supplies of food or water, west bank law enforcement personnel determined that they were unable to further assist the evacuees. It was also believed at that time that federal relief efforts and supplies were soon to be concentrated in the downtown area of New Orleans.  The decision to stop further evacuees from crossing the river was then made after Oakwood Center mall was looted and burned by evacuees from the east bank of New Orleans. A unified local police decision was made to lock down all areas. Due to the lack of effective communications during the crisis, some New Orleans police officers independently continued to direct evacuees to buses across the bridge that were no longer operational. The inevitable confrontation occurred on the section of the bridge controlled by the Gretna police, and warning shots were fired over the heads of desperate evacuees who had been misdirected onto the bridge.

Post–Katrina
A business report released in April 2007 found Jefferson Parish led the nation in job growth, for the quarter ending September 30, 2006,

as rebuilding continued after Hurricane Katrina. Jefferson Parish president Aaron Broussard believed that Jefferson Parish would reach pre-Katrina numbers or even exceed those numbers, as residents who were still evacuated from New Orleans returned to Jefferson Parish to be closer to New Orleans as they await federal recovery money to repair their homes.

Geography

Lake Pontchartrain is situated in the northern part of Jefferson Parish with the parish line several miles north of the southern shore, with St. Tammany Parish at its northern shore. The Mississippi River is located around the midpoint of Jefferson Parish flowing generally in a north-west to south-east direction.

Surrounding parishes include St. Tammany Parish, Louisiana at the north shore of Lake Pontchartrain, St. Charles Parish upriver to the west, Orleans Parish downriver to the east, and Plaquemines Parish downriver to the south-east. The majority of the southern half of Jefferson Parish is uninhabited marshland with one of the exceptions being the town of Grand Isle; the only roads connecting Grand Isle to the rest of Jefferson Parish run through Lafourche Parish and St. Charles Parish.

National protected area
 Jean Lafitte National Historical Park and Preserve (part, in Marrero)

State parks
 Bayou Segnette State Park
 Grand Isle State Park

Adjacent parishes

 Orleans Parish (east)
 St. Bernard Parish (east)
 Plaquemines Parish (east)
 Lafourche Parish (west)
 St. Charles Parish (west)
 St. Tammany Parish (north)

Communities

Cities 
 Gretna (parish seat)
 Harahan
 Kenner (largest municipality)
 Westwego

Towns
 Grand Isle
 Jean Lafitte

Census-designated places

 Avondale
 Barataria
 Bridge City
 Elmwood
 Estelle
 Harvey
 Jefferson
 Lafitte
 Marrero
 Metairie
 River Ridge
 Terrytown
 Timberlane
 Waggaman
 Woodmere
 Crown Point

Ghost town
 Cheniere Caminada

Demographics

In 1830, the U.S. Census Bureau reported a population of 6,846; since the 2020 U.S. census, its population has grown to 440,781 people, 171,991 households, and 108,177 families residing in the parish.

In 2019, the racial and ethnic makeup of the parish was an estimated 52.6% non-Hispanic white, 26.4% Black and African American, 0.3% American Indian or Alaska Native, 4.2% Asian, <0.0% Native Hawaiian or other Pacific Islander, 0.3% some other race, 1.7% two or more races, and 14.5% Hispanic or Latino American of any race. At the 2020 U.S. census, the racial and ethnic makeup was a tabulated 47.28% non-Hispanic white, 26.29% Black or African American, 0.3% American Indian or Alaska Native, 4.43% Asian, 0.02% Pacific Islander, 3.74% multiracial, and 17.94% Hispanic or Latino American of any race, representing a nationwide demographic shift of diversification from the predominant non-Hispanic white population.

Greg Rigamer, a consultant of WWL-TV Eyewitness News and demographer, stated that, between the 2000 U.S. census and the 2010 U.S. census, the overall population of Jefferson Parish decreased while its population of Hispanic and Latino Americans increased. He argued that this was due to Hispanic and Latino Americans arriving after Hurricane Katrina in 2005 to assist the already existing Hispanic and Latin community in Jefferson Parish. As of 2011, more than 15% of the parish population was Hispanic.

At the 2019 American Community Survey, there were 169,452 households and 188,511 housing units with an owner-occupied rate of 61.2%. The median value of an owner-occupied housing unit was $188,200 and median gross rent for the parish was $972. The median household income for Jefferson Parish was $54,032 and males had a median annual income of $48,933 versus $38,442 for females. Jefferson's overall poverty rate was 15.5%, and 25.3% of children under age 18 lived at or below the poverty line.

Among the religious community in Jefferson Parish, most have identified as Christian. The predominant religious institution of Christendom in the parish is the Catholic Church, primarily served by the Roman Catholic Archdiocese of New Orleans. There is also a prominent Baptist population identifying with the Southern Baptist Convention. In Gretna, there were at least two Assemblies of God USA congregations reflecting the area's Pentecostal population as of 2022. Of note among Baptists and Pentecostals, there have also been several historically Black or African American Baptist and Pentecostal churches in the parish.

Economy
The economy of Jefferson Parish has often been tied to that of New Orleans, being a part of its metropolitan area.

According to the parish's 2011 Comprehensive Annual Financial Report, the top employers in the parish were:

Other notable employers in the parish have been Friedrich Custom Manufacturing, a leading maker of police barricades, including the ones used by the New York City Police Department; and Starr Textiles, which relocated to the parish from New Orleans.

Since the inception of the COVID-19 pandemic in 2020, the parish has been laboring on a plan for redeveloping and diversifying its economy to attract more businesses. A five-year economic development plan was issued by the Jefferson Parish Economic Development Commission.

Education

The parish's public schools are operated by Jefferson Parish Public Schools. The Jefferson Parish Library operates the public libraries.

Historically a significant number of the parish's students were in private schools, and as of 2015 Catholic schools (of the Roman Catholic Archdiocese of New Orleans) had the majority of private school students. In 2000 the parish was the American county equivalent with the second highest per capita enrollment in private school. As of October 1, 2014 there were fewer than 18,000 students in Jefferson Parish, or over 25% of the children of the ages for K-12 education, who attended private schools approved by the State of Louisiana. There were also 1,246 children in the parish who were homeschooling or who were in private schools not approved by the state.

From 2013–2014 to 2014–2015 the percentage of students in the parish's private schools declined by 4%; the Catholic schools specifically had the same percentage of enrollment decline. The non-Catholic private schools together had a 3% decline. Jessica Williams of The Times Picayune stated that the establishment of charter schools and improved options in Jefferson Parish district schools, along with Hurricane Katrina in 2005 and the 2008 recession, caused decreases in private school enrollment.

Government and infrastructure
Cynthia Lee-Sheng, daughter of former Sheriff Harry Lee is the current President of Jefferson Parish, elected in 2019.

The Bridge City Center for Youth, a juvenile correctional facility for boys operated by the Louisiana Office of Juvenile Justice, is in Bridge City, an unincorporated area in the parish.

Politics
Jefferson Parish was one of the first areas of Louisiana to turn Republican. It has not voted for a Democrat for president since John F. Kennedy in 1960. In the 2008 Presidential election, Jefferson Parish cast a majority of votes for Republican John McCain, who won 63% of the vote and 113,191 votes. Democrat Barack Obama won 36% of the votes and 65,096 votes. Although John McCain easily won Jefferson Parish, in the U.S Senate race that same year between Democrat Mary Landrieu and Republican John Neely Kennedy, Landrieu won Jefferson Parish. She won 52% of the vote and 91,966 votes. John Kennedy won 46% of the vote and 79,965 votes. Other candidates won 2% of the vote. In 2004, Republican George W. Bush won 62% of the vote and 117,882 votes. Democrat John F. Kerry won 38% of the votes and 72,136 votes.

Since 2008, in contrast to much of the rest of Louisiana shifting somewhat towards the Republicans, Jefferson Parish appears to be trending slightly Democratic at the presidential level. In 2012, Mitt Romney won it with only 58.2% of the vote, and in 2016, despite still losing the parish to Donald Trump, Hillary Clinton became the second Democrat since her husband in 1996, and only the third since Jimmy Carter in 1976, to crack 40% of the vote there. In 2020, Joe Biden cut the Republican margin to just 11 points, the lowest Republican margin since it voted for Bob Dole by just 6.7 points in 1996.

Transportation

Roads 
Jefferson Parish is served by one interstate highway and multiple U.S. and state highways.

East Bank 
  Interstate 10 – connects the East Bank to St. Charles Parish upriver and New Orleans downriver.
  U.S. Highway 61 – connects the East Bank to St. Charles Parish upriver and New Orleans downriver.
  U.S. Highway 90 – connects the East Bank to the West Bank on the south (via the Huey P. Long Bridge) and to New Orleans downriver (via Jefferson Highway).
 Lake Pontchartrain Causeway – connects the East Bank to St. Tammany Parish on the north via Causeway Boulevard across Lake Pontchartrain.

West Bank 
  U.S. Highway 90 – connects the West Bank to the East Bank on the north (via the Huey P. Long Bridge) and to St. Charles Parish upriver.
  U.S. Highway 90 Business – connects the West Bank to New Orleans on the east and intersecting U.S. Highway 90 to the west.
 Planned future route of  Interstate 49.
  Louisiana Highway 18 – connects the West Bank to St. Charles Parish.
  Louisiana Highway 23 – connects the West Bank to Plaquemines Parish.
  Louisiana Highway 45 – connects the West Bank with the towns in the southern portion of Jefferson Parish (Jean Lafitte, Lafitte and Barataria).

Grand Isle 
  Louisiana Highway 1 – connects Grand Isle to Lafourche Parish

Public Transportation 

Jefferson Parish Transit (formerly known as JeT) serves the parish with 11 bus routes, an on-demand zone, and paratransit services. It also operates a special "Hurricane Evacuation System" when the parish is under evacuation orders due to an impending severe hurricane.

Notable people

 John Alario, Republican state senator from Jefferson Parish and Senate President since 2012; former Democratic Speaker of the Louisiana House of Representatives (1984–1988, 1992–1996)
 Sherman A. Bernard (1925–2012), Louisiana insurance commissioner from 1972 to 1988
 Jay Chevalier, singer and politician
 Robert Billiot, member of the Louisiana House of Representatives for Jefferson Parish since 2008; former educator from Westwego, succeeded John Alario in the House
 Tom Capella, Republican assessor of Jefferson Parish; former state representative and former Jefferson Parish Council member
 Patrick Connick, Republican state representative from Jefferson Parish
 Charles Cusimano, former state representative and judge from Jefferson Parish
 Ellen DeGeneres, American stand-up comedian, television host and actress born at Ochsner Hospital in Jefferson Parish in 1958
 Jim Donelon, Louisiana insurance commissioner; former state representative
 Eddie Doucet, state representative for District 78 in Jefferson Parish from 1972 to 1988
 David Duke, Klansman and former state representative for District 81 in Jefferson Parish
 Robert T. Garrity, Jr., former state representative for District 78 in Jefferson Parish
 Randal Gaines, African-American member of the Louisiana House for St. Charles and St. John the Baptist parishes; former resident of Kenner
 James Garvey, Jr., Republican member of the Louisiana Board of Elementary and Secondary Education for District 1, which includes Jefferson Parish
 Kernan "Skip" Hand, former state representative and former Jefferson Parish district court judge
 Jennifer Sneed Heebe, former state representative and former member of the Jefferson Parish Council; resident of New Orleans since 2008
 Girod Jackson, III, Democratic former state representative for District 87 in Jefferson Parish
 Salman "Sal" Khan, founder of Khan Academy
 Hank Lauricella (1930–2014), college football All-American for the Tennessee Volunteers; state representative and state senator
 Harry Lee (1932–2007), iconic longtime sheriff of Jefferson Parish from 1980 to 2007
 Tony Ligi, Republican former state representative for District 79 in Jefferson Parish; director of the Jefferson Business Council
 Danny Martiny, state senator from Jefferson Parish
 Elwyn Nicholson, state senator from Jefferson Parish from 1972 to 1988
 Newell Normand, Jefferson Parish sheriff from Harry Lee's death in 2007 to 2017
Mel Ott, member of the Major League Baseball Hall of Fame, born in Gretna, 1909.
 Julie Quinn, Republican former state senator from Jefferson
 Steven Seagal, Reserve Deputy Chief of Jefferson Parish
 Julie Stokes, Republican current state representative from District 79
 James St. Raymond, Republican former state representative for District 89 in Orleans Parish; businessman, former resident of Jefferson Parish
 Ricky Templet, Republican former state representative from Jefferson Parish; Gretna city council member
 Steve Theriot, former state representative and former state legislative auditor; accountant and lobbyist
 David C. Treen (1928–2009), former Congressman (1973–1980) and governor (1980–1984); later relocated to St. Tammany Parish
 John S. Treen (1926-2020), politician
 Chris Ullo, member of both houses of the state legislature (1972–2008)
 Roger F. Villere, Jr., chairman of the Louisiana Republican Party
 Ebony Woodruff, state representative for District 87 in Jefferson Parish since 2013
 Amy Coney Barrett, associate justice of the Supreme Court of the United States since 2020

See also
 Jefferson Transit
 National Register of Historic Places listings in Jefferson Parish, Louisiana
 West Return Floodwall

References

External links

 Official website
 Jefferson Parish Sheriff's Office
 Jefferson Parish Convention and Visitors Bureau – Tourism
 Jefferson Parish Clerk of Court's Office
 Jefferson Historical Society of Louisiana
 East Jefferson Online Community – current events, history and organizational information.

 
Louisiana parishes
1825 establishments in Louisiana
Louisiana parishes on the Mississippi River
Parishes in New Orleans metropolitan area
Populated places established in 1825
Majority-minority parishes in Louisiana